This is a list of electoral division results for the Australian 1963 federal election.

Overall
This section is an excerpt from 1963 Australian federal election § Results

New South Wales

Banks 
This section is an excerpt from Electoral results for the Division of Banks § 1963

Barton 
This section is an excerpt from Electoral results for the Division of Barton § 1963

Bennelong 
This section is an excerpt from Electoral results for the Division of Bennelong § 1963

Blaxland 
This section is an excerpt from Electoral results for the Division of Blaxland § 1963

Bradfield 
This section is an excerpt from Electoral results for the Division of Bradfield § 1963

Calare 
This section is an excerpt from Electoral results for the Division of Calare § 1963

Cowper 
This section is an excerpt from Electoral results for the Division of Cowper § 1963

Cunningham 
This section is an excerpt from Electoral results for the Division of Cunningham § 1963

Dalley 
This section is an excerpt from Electoral results for the Division of Dalley § 1963

Darling 
This section is an excerpt from Electoral results for the Division of Darling § 1963

East Sydney 
This section is an excerpt from Electoral results for the Division of East Sydney § 1963

Eden-Monaro 
This section is an excerpt from Electoral results for the Division of Eden-Monaro § 1963

Evans 
This section is an excerpt from Electoral results for the Division of Evans § 1963

Farrer 
This section is an excerpt from Electoral results for the Division of Farrer § 1963

Grayndler 
This section is an excerpt from Electoral results for the Division of Grayndler § 1963

Gwydir 
This section is an excerpt from Electoral results for the Division of Gwydir § 1963

Hughes 
This section is an excerpt from Electoral results for the Division of Hughes § 1963

Hume 
This section is an excerpt from Electoral results for the Division of Hume § 1963

Hunter 
This section is an excerpt from Electoral results for the Division of Hunter § 1963

Kingsford Smith 
This section is an excerpt from Electoral results for the Division of Kingsford Smith § 1963

Lang 
This section is an excerpt from Electoral results for the Division of Lang § 1963

Lawson 
This section is an excerpt from Electoral results for the Division of Lawson § 1963

Lowe 
This section is an excerpt from Electoral results for the Division of Lowe § 1963

Lyne 
This section is an excerpt from Electoral results for the Division of Lyne § 1963

Macarthur 
This section is an excerpt from Electoral results for the Division of Macarthur § 1963

Mackellar 
This section is an excerpt from Electoral results for the Division of Mackellar § 1963

Macquarie 
This section is an excerpt from Electoral results for the Division of Macquarie § 1963

Mitchell 
This section is an excerpt from Electoral results for the Division of Mitchell § 1963

New England 
This section is an excerpt from Electoral results for the Division of New England § 1963

Newcastle 
This section is an excerpt from Electoral results for the Division of Newcastle1963

North Sydney 
This section is an excerpt from Electoral results for the Division of North Sydney § 1963

Parkes 
This section is an excerpt from Electoral results for the Division of Parkes (1901–1969) § 1963

Parramatta 
This section is an excerpt from Electoral results for the Division of Parramatta § 1963

Paterson 
This section is an excerpt from Electoral results for the Division of Paterson § 1963

Phillip 
This section is an excerpt from Electoral results for the Division of Phillip § 1963

Reid
This section is an excerpt from Electoral results for the Division of Reid § 1963

Richmond 
This section is an excerpt from Electoral results for the Division of Richmond § 1963

Riverina 
This section is an excerpt from Electoral results for the Division of Riverina § 1963

Robertson 
This section is an excerpt from Electoral results for the Division of Robertson § 1963

Shortland 
This section is an excerpt from Electoral results for the Division of Shortland § 1963

St George 
This section is an excerpt from Electoral results for the Division of St George § 1963

Warringah 
This section is an excerpt from Electoral results for the Division of Warringah § 1963

Watson 
This section is an excerpt from Electoral results for the Division of Watson (1934–1969) § 1963

Wentworth 
This section is an excerpt from Electoral results for the Division of Wentworth § 1963

Werriwa 
This section is an excerpt from Electoral results for the Division of Werriwa § 1963

West Sydney 
This section is an excerpt from Electoral results for the Division of West Sydney § 1963

Victoria

Balaclava 
This section is an excerpt from Electoral results for the Division of Balaclava § 1963

Ballaarat 
This section is an excerpt from Electoral results for the Division of Ballarat § 1963

Batman 
This section is an excerpt from Electoral results for the Division of Batman § 1963

Bendigo 
This section is an excerpt from Electoral results for the Division of Bendigo § 1963

Bruce 
This section is an excerpt from Electoral results for the Division of Bruce § 1963

Chisholm 
This section is an excerpt from Electoral results for the Division of Chisholm § 1963

Corangamite 
This section is an excerpt from Electoral results for the Division of Corangamite § 1963

Corio 
This section is an excerpt from Electoral results for the Division of Corio § 1963

Darebin 
This section is an excerpt from Electoral results for the Division of Darebin § 1963

Deakin 
This section is an excerpt from Electoral results for the Division of Deakin § 1963

Fawkner 
This section is an excerpt from Electoral results for the Division of Fawkner § 1963

Flinders 
This section is an excerpt from Electoral results for the Division of Flinders § 1963

Gellibrand 
This section is an excerpt from Electoral results for the Division of Gellibrand § 1963

Gippsland 
This section is an excerpt from Electoral results for the Division of Gippsland § 1963

Henty 
This section is an excerpt from Electoral results for the Division of Henty § 1963

Higgins 
This section is an excerpt from Electoral results for the Division of Higgins § 1963

Higinbotham 
This section is an excerpt from Electoral results for the Division of Higinbotham § 1963

Indi 
This section is an excerpt from Electoral results for the Division of Indi § 1963

Isaacs 
This section is an excerpt from Electoral results for the Division of Isaacs (1949–1969) § 1963

Kooyong 
This section is an excerpt from Electoral results for the Division of Kooyong § 1963

La Trobe 
This section is an excerpt from Electoral results for the Division of La Trobe § 1963

Lalor 
This section is an excerpt from Electoral results for the Division of Lalor § 1963

Mallee 
This section is an excerpt from Electoral results for the Division of Mallee § 1963

Maribyrnong 
This section is an excerpt from Electoral results for the Division of Maribyrnong § 1963

McMillan 
This section is an excerpt from Electoral results for the Division of McMillan § 1963

Melbourne 
This section is an excerpt from Electoral results for the Division of Melbourne § 1963

Melbourne Ports 
This section is an excerpt from Electoral results for the Division of Melbourne Ports § 1963

Murray 
This section is an excerpt from Electoral results for the Division of Murray § 1963

Scullin 
This section is an excerpt from Electoral results for the Division of Scullin (1955–69) § 1963

Wannon 
This section is an excerpt from Electoral results for the Division of Wannon § 1963

Wills 
This section is an excerpt from Electoral results for the Division of Wills § 1963

Wimmera 
This section is an excerpt from Electoral results for the Division of Wimmera § 1963

Yarra 
This section is an excerpt from Electoral results for the Division of Yarra § 1963

Queensland

Bowman 
This section is an excerpt from Electoral results for the Division of Bowman § 1963

Brisbane 
This section is an excerpt from Electoral results for the Division of Brisbane § 1963

Capricornia 
This section is an excerpt from Electoral results for the Division of Capricornia § 1963

Darling Downs 
This section is an excerpt from Electoral results for the Division of Darling Downs § 1963

Dawson
This section is an excerpt from Electoral results for the Division of Dawson § 1963

Fisher 
This section is an excerpt from Electoral results for the Division of Fisher § 1963

Griffith 
This section is an excerpt from Electoral results for the Division of Griffith § 1963

Herbert 
This section is an excerpt from Electoral results for the Division of Herbert § 1963

Kennedy 
This section is an excerpt from Electoral results for the Division of Kennedy § 1963

Leichhardt 
This section is an excerpt from Electoral results for the Division of Leichhardt § 1963

Lilley 
This section is an excerpt from Electoral results for the Division of Lilley § 1963

Maranoa 
This section is an excerpt from Electoral results for the Division of Maranoa § 1963

McPherson 
This section is an excerpt from Electoral results for the Division of McPherson § 1963

Moreton 
This section is an excerpt from Electoral results for the Division of Moreton § 1963

Oxley 
This section is an excerpt from Electoral results for the Division of Oxley § 1963

Petrie 
This section is an excerpt from Electoral results for the Division of Petrie § 1963

Ryan 
This section is an excerpt from Electoral results for the Division of Ryan § 1963

Wide Bay 
This section is an excerpt from Electoral results for the Division of Wide Bay § 1963

South Australia

Adelaide 
This section is an excerpt from Electoral results for the Division of Adelaide § 1963

Angas 
This section is an excerpt from Electoral results for the Division of Angas (1949–1977) § 1949

Barker 
This section is an excerpt from Electoral results for the Division of Barker § 1963

Bonython 
This section is an excerpt from Electoral results for the Division of Bonython § 1963

Boothby 
This section is an excerpt from Electoral results for the Division of Boothby § 1963

Grey 
This section is an excerpt from Electoral results for the Division of Grey § 1963

Hindmarsh 
This section is an excerpt from Electoral results for the Division of Hindmarsh § 1963

Kingston 
This section is an excerpt from Electoral results for the Division of Kingston § 1963

Port Adelaide 
This section is an excerpt from Electoral results for the Division of Port Adelaide § 1963

Sturt 
This section is an excerpt from Electoral results for the Division of Sturt § 1963

Wakefield 
This section is an excerpt from Electoral results for the Division of Wakefield § 1963

Western Australia

Canning 
This section is an excerpt from Electoral results for the Division of Canning § 1963

Curtin 
This section is an excerpt from Electoral results for the Division of Curtin § 1963

Forrest 
This section is an excerpt from Electoral results for the Division of Forrest § 1963

Fremantle 
This section is an excerpt from Electoral results for the Division of Fremantle § 1963

Kalgoorlie 
This section is an excerpt from Electoral results for the Division of Kalgoorlie § 1963

Moore 
This section is an excerpt from Electoral results for the Division of Moore § 1963

Perth 
This section is an excerpt from Electoral results for the Division of Perth § 1963

Stirling 
This section is an excerpt from Electoral results for the Division of Stirling § 1963

Swan 
This section is an excerpt from Electoral results for the Division of Swan § 1963

Tasmania

Bass 
This section is an excerpt from Electoral results for the Division of Bass § 1963

Braddon 
This section is an excerpt from Electoral results for the Division of Braddon § 1963

Denison 
This section is an excerpt from Electoral results for the Division of Denison § 1963

Franklin 
This section is an excerpt from Electoral results for the Division of Franklin § 1963

Wilmot 
This section is an excerpt from Electoral results for the Division of Wilmot § 1963

Territories

Australian Capital Territory 
This section is an excerpt from Electoral results for the Division of Australian Capital Territory § 1963

Northern Territory 
This section is an excerpt from Electoral results for the Division of Northern Territory § 1963

See also 

 Candidates of the 1963 Australian federal election
 Members of the Australian House of Representatives, 1963–1966

References 

House of Representatives 1963